Fuertesimalva is a genus of flowering plants in the mallow family Malvaceae, native to Mexico, Venezuela, Colombia, Ecuador, Bolivia, Peru and Argentina. Most species in this genus were originally placed in Urocarpidium.

Species
Species currently accepted by The Plant List are as follows: 
Fuertesimalva chilensis (A.Braun & C.D.Bouché) Fryxell
Fuertesimalva corniculata (Krapov.) Fryxell
Fuertesimalva echinata (C.Presl) Fryxell
Fuertesimalva insularis (Kearney) Fryxell
Fuertesimalva jacens (S.Watson) Fryxell
Fuertesimalva killipii (Krapov.) Fryxell
Fuertesimalva leptocalyx (Krapov.) Fryxell
Fuertesimalva limensis (L.) Fryxell
Fuertesimalva pennellii (Ulbr.) Fryxell
Fuertesimalva pentacocca (Krapov.) Fryxell
Fuertesimalva pentandra (K.Schum.) Fryxell
Fuertesimalva peruviana (L.) Fryxell
Fuertesimalva sanambrosiana (D.M.Bates) Fryxell
Fuertesimalva stipulata (Fryxell) Fryxell

References

Malvaceae genera
Malveae